The Arena Football League Defensive Player of the Year Award is given by the Arena Football League to the league's most outstanding defensive player at the end of every AFL season since 1996. Multiple-award winners include Kenny McEntyre, Clevan Thomas, and Joe Sykes; McEntyre and Thomas have won the award three times each, while Sykes has won it twice. Thomas and Vic Hall are the only players to win the award as a rookie (2002 & 2011 respectively). The award was sponsored by ADT Security Services from 2002 to 2008. Since 2010, the award has been sponsored by Riddell.

AFL Defensive Players of the Year

References

External links
AFL Defensive Player of the Year

Arena Football League trophies and awards